The scientific method is an empirical method for acquiring knowledge that has characterized the development of science since at least the 17th century (with notable practitioners in previous centuries; see the article history of scientific method for additional detail.) It involves careful observation, applying rigorous skepticism about what is observed, given that cognitive assumptions can distort how one interprets the observation. It involves formulating hypotheses, via induction, based on such observations; the testability of hypotheses, experimental and the measurement-based statistical testing of deductions drawn from the hypotheses; and refinement (or elimination) of the hypotheses based on the experimental findings. These are principles of the scientific method, as distinguished from a definitive series of steps applicable to all scientific enterprises.

Although procedures vary from one field of inquiry to another, the underlying process is frequently the same from one field to another. The process in the scientific method involves making conjectures (hypothetical explanations), deriving predictions from the hypotheses as logical consequences, and then carrying out experiments or empirical observations based on those predictions. A hypothesis is a conjecture, based on knowledge obtained while seeking answers to the question. The hypothesis might be very specific, or it might be broad. Scientists then test hypotheses by conducting experiments or studies. A scientific hypothesis must be falsifiable, implying that it is possible to identify a possible outcome of an experiment or observation that conflicts with predictions deduced from the hypothesis; otherwise, the hypothesis cannot be meaningfully tested.

The purpose of an experiment is to determine whether observations  agree with or conflict with the expectations deduced from a hypothesis. Experiments can take place anywhere from a garage to a remote mountaintop to CERN's Large Hadron Collider. There are difficulties in a formulaic statement of method, however. Though the scientific method is often presented as a fixed sequence of steps, it represents rather a set of general principles. Not all steps take place in every scientific inquiry (nor to the same degree), and they are not always in the same order.

History

Important debates in the history of science concern skepticism that anything can be known for sure (such as views of Francisco Sanches), rationalism (especially as advocated by René Descartes), inductivism, empiricism (as argued for by Francis Bacon, then rising to particular prominence with Isaac Newton and his followers), and hypothetico-deductivism, which came to the fore in the early 19th century.

The term "scientific method" emerged in the 19th century, when a significant institutional development of science was taking place and terminologies establishing clear boundaries between science and non-science, such as "scientist" and "pseudoscience", appeared. Throughout the 1830s and 1850s, at which time Baconianism was popular, naturalists like William Whewell, John Herschel, John Stuart Mill engaged in debates over "induction" and "facts" and were focused on how to generate knowledge. In the late 19th and early 20th centuries, a debate over realism vs. antirealism was conducted as powerful scientific theories extended beyond the realm of the observable.

Problem-solving via scientific method
See Notes section § Problem-solving via scientific method

The term "scientific method" came into popular use in the twentieth century; Dewey's 1910 book, How We Think, inspired popular guidelines, popping up in dictionaries and science textbooks, although there was little consensus over its meaning. Although there was growth through the middle of the twentieth century, by the 1960s and 1970s numerous influential philosophers of science such as Thomas Kuhn and Paul Feyerabend had questioned the universality of the "scientific method" and in doing so largely replaced the notion of science as a homogeneous and universal method with that of it being a heterogeneous and local practice. In particular, Paul Feyerabend, in the 1975 first edition of his book Against Method, argued against there being any universal rules of science; Popper 1963, Gauch 2003, and Tow 2010 disagree with Feyerabend's claim; problem solvers, and researchers are to be prudent with their resources during their inquiry.

Later stances include physicist Lee Smolin's 2013 essay "There Is No Scientific Method", in which he espouses two ethical principles, and historian of science Daniel Thurs's chapter in the 2015 book Newton's Apple and Other Myths about Science, which concluded that the scientific method is a myth or, at best, an idealization. As myths are beliefs, they are subject to the narrative fallacy as Taleb points out. Philosophers Robert Nola and Howard Sankey, in their 2007 book Theories of Scientific Method, said that debates over scientific method continue, and argued that Feyerabend, despite the title of Against Method, accepted certain rules of method and attempted to justify those rules with a meta methodology. 
Staddon (2017) argues it is a mistake to try following rules in the absence of an algorithmic scientific method; in that case, "science is best understood through examples". But algorithmic methods, such as disproof of existing theory by experiment have been used since Alhacen (1027) Book of Optics, and Galileo (1638) Two New Sciences, and The Assayer still stand as scientific method. They contradict Feyerabend's stance. 

The ubiquitous element in the scientific method is empiricism. This is in opposition to stringent forms of rationalism: the scientific method embodies the position that reason alone cannot solve a particular scientific problem. A strong formulation of the scientific method is not always aligned with a form of empiricism in which the empirical data is put forward in the form of experience or other abstracted forms of knowledge; in current scientific practice, however, the use of scientific modelling and reliance on abstract typologies and theories is normally accepted. The scientific method counters claims that revelation, political or religious dogma, appeals to tradition, commonly held beliefs, common sense, or currently held theories pose the only possible means of demonstrating truth.

Different early expressions of empiricism and the scientific method can be found throughout history, for instance with the ancient Stoics, Epicurus, Alhazen, Avicenna, Roger Bacon, and William of Ockham. From the 16th century onwards, experiments were advocated by Francis Bacon, and performed by Giambattista della Porta, Johannes Kepler, and Galileo Galilei. There was particular development aided by theoretical works by Francisco Sanches, John Locke, George Berkeley, and David Hume.

A sea voyage from America to Europe afforded C. S. Peirce the distance to clarify his ideas, gradually resulting in the hypothetico-deductive model. Formulated in the 20th century, the model has undergone significant revision since first proposed (for a more formal discussion, see ).

Overview

The scientific method is the process by which science is carried out. As in other areas of inquiry, science (through the scientific method) can build on previous knowledge and develop a more sophisticated understanding of its topics of study over time. This model can be seen to underlie the scientific revolution.

Process
The overall process involves making conjectures (hypotheses), deriving predictions from them as logical consequences, and then carrying out experiments based on those predictions to determine whether the original conjecture was correct. There are difficulties in a formulaic statement of method, however. Though the scientific method is often presented as a fixed sequence of steps, these actions are better considered as general principles. Not all steps take place in every scientific inquiry (nor to the same degree), and they are not always done in the same order. As noted by scientist and philosopher William Whewell (1794–1866), "invention, sagacity, [and] genius" are required at every step.

Formulation of a question
The question can refer to the explanation of a specific observation, as in "Why is the sky blue?" but can also be open-ended, as in "How can I design a drug to cure this particular disease?" This stage frequently involves finding and evaluating evidence from previous experiments, personal scientific observations or assertions, as well as the work of other scientists. If the answer is already known, a different question that builds on the evidence can be posed. When applying the scientific method to research, determining a good question can be very difficult and it will affect the outcome of the investigation.

Hypothesis
A hypothesis is a conjecture, based on knowledge obtained while formulating the question, that may explain any given behavior. The hypothesis might be very specific; for example, Einstein's equivalence principle or Francis Crick's "DNA makes RNA makes protein", or it might be broad; for example, "unknown species of life dwell in the unexplored depths of the oceans". See § Hypothesis development

A statistical hypothesis is a conjecture about a given statistical population. For example, the population might be people with a particular disease. One conjecture might be that a new drug will cure the disease in some of the people in that population, as in a clinical trial of the drug. A null hypothesis would conjecture that the statistical hypothesis is false; for example, that the new drug does nothing, and that any cure in the population would be caused by chance (a random variable).

An alternative to the null hypothesis, to be falsifiable, must say that a treatment program with the drug does better than chance. To test the statement a treatment program with the drug does better than chance, an experiment is designed in which a portion of the population (the control group), is to be left untreated, while another, separate portion of the population is to be treated. t-Tests could then specify how large the treated groups, and how large the control groups are to be, in order to infer whether some course of treatment of the population has resulted in a cure of some of them, in each of the groups. The groups are examined, in turn by the researchers, in a protocol.

Strong inference could alternatively propose multiple alternative hypotheses embodied in randomized controlled trials, treatments A, B, C, ... , (say in a blinded experiment with varying dosages, or with lifestyle changes, and so forth) so as not to introduce confirmation bias in favor of a specific course of treatment. Ethical considerations could be used, to minimize the numbers in the untreated groups, e.g., use almost every treatment in every group, but excluding A, B, C, ..., respectively as controls.

Prediction
The prediction step deduces the logical consequences of the hypothesis before the outcome is known. These predictions are expectations for the results of testing. If the result is already known, it is evidence that is ready to be considered in acceptance or rejection of the hypothesis. 
The evidence is also stronger if the actual result of the predictive test is not already known, as tampering with the test can be ruled out, as can hindsight bias (see postdiction). Ideally, the prediction must also distinguish the hypothesis from likely alternatives; if two hypotheses make the same prediction, observing the prediction to be correct is not evidence for either one over the other. (These statements about the relative strength of evidence can be mathematically derived using Bayes' Theorem).

The consequence, therefore, is to be stated at the same time or briefly after the statement of the hypothesis, but before the experimental result is known.

Likewise, the test protocol is to be stated before execution of the test. These requirements become precautions against tampering, and aid the reproducibility of the experiment.

Testing
Suitable tests of a hypothesis compare the expected values from the tests of that hypothesis with the actual results of those tests. Scientists (and other people) can then secure, or discard, their hypotheses by conducting suitable experiments.

Analysis
An analysis determines, from the results of the experiment, the next actions to take. The expected values from the test of the alternative hypothesis are compared to the expected values resulting from the null hypothesis (that is, a prediction of no difference in the status quo). The difference between expected versus actual indicates which hypothesis better explains the resulting data from the experiment. In cases where an experiment is repeated many times, a statistical analysis such as a chi-squared test whether the null hypothesis is true, may be required.

Evidence from other scientists, and from experience are available for incorporation at any stage in the process. Depending on the complexity of the experiment, iteration of the process may be required to gather sufficient evidence to answer the question with confidence, or to build up other answers to highly specific questions, to answer a single broader question.

When the evidence has falsified the alternative hypothesis, a new hypothesis is required; if the evidence does not conclusively justify discarding the alternative hypothesis, other predictions from the alternative hypothesis might be considered. Pragmatic considerations, such as the resources available to continue inquiry, might guide the investigation's further course. When evidence for a hypothesis strongly supports that hypothesis, further questioning can follow, for insight into the broader inquiry under investigation.

DNA example

The basic elements of the scientific method are illustrated by the following example (which occurred from 1944 to 1953) from the discovery of the structure of DNA:
 Question: Previous investigation of DNA had determined its chemical composition (the four nucleotides), the structure of each individual nucleotide, and other properties. DNA had been identified as the carrier of genetic information by the Avery–MacLeod–McCarty experiment in 1944, but the mechanism of how genetic information was stored in DNA was unclear.
 Hypothesis: Linus Pauling, Francis Crick and James D. Watson hypothesized that DNA had a helical structure.
 Prediction: If DNA had a helical structure, its X-ray diffraction pattern would be X-shaped. This prediction was determined using the mathematics of the helix transform, which had been derived by Cochran, Crick, and Vand (and independently by Stokes). This prediction was a mathematical construct, completely independent from the biological problem at hand.
 Experiment: Rosalind Franklin used pure DNA to perform X-ray diffraction to produce photo 51. The results showed an X-shape.
 Analysis: When Watson saw the detailed diffraction pattern, he immediately recognized it as a helix. He and Crick then produced their model, using this information along with the previously known information about DNA's composition, especially Chargaff's rules of base pairing.

The discovery became the starting point for many further studies involving the genetic material, such as the field of molecular genetics, and it was awarded the Nobel Prize in 1962. Each step of the example is examined in more detail later in the article.

Other components
The scientific method also includes other components required even when all the iterations of the steps above have been completed:

Replication
If an experiment cannot be repeated to produce the same results, this implies that the original results might have been in error. As a result, it is common for a single experiment to be performed multiple times, especially when there are uncontrolled variables or other indications of experimental error. For significant or surprising results, other scientists may also attempt to replicate the results for themselves, especially if those results would be important to their own work.
Replication has become a contentious issue in social and biomedical science where treatments are administered to groups of individuals. Typically an experimental group gets the treatment, such as a drug, and the control group gets a placebo. John Ioannidis in 2005 pointed out that the method being used has led to many findings that cannot be replicated.

External review
The process of peer review involves evaluation of the experiment by experts, who typically give their opinions anonymously. Some journals request that the experimenter provide lists of possible peer reviewers, especially if the field is highly specialized. Peer review does not certify the correctness of the results, only that, in the opinion of the reviewer, the experiments themselves were sound (based on the description supplied by the experimenter). If the work passes peer review, which occasionally may require new experiments requested by the reviewers, it will be published in a peer-reviewed scientific journal. The specific journal that publishes the results indicates the perceived quality of the work.

Data recording and sharing
Scientists typically are careful in recording their data, a requirement promoted by Ludwik Fleck (1896–1961) and others. Though not typically required, they might be requested to supply this data to other scientists who wish to replicate their original results (or parts of their original results), extending to the sharing of any experimental samples that may be difficult to obtain. See §Communication and community.

Instrumentation
 See scientific community, big science.
Institutional researchers might acquire an instrument to institutionalize their tests. These instruments would use observations of the real world, which might agree with, or perhaps conflict with, their predictions deduced from their hypothesis. These institutions thereby reduce the research function to a cost/benefit, which is expressed as money, and the time and attention of the researchers to be expended, in exchange for a report to their constituents.

Current large instruments, such as CERN's Large Hadron Collider (LHC), or LIGO, or the National Ignition Facility (NIF), or the International Space Station (ISS), or the James Webb Space Telescope (JWST), entail expected costs of billions of dollars, and timeframes extending over decades. These kinds of institutions affect public policy, on a national or even international basis, and the researchers would require shared access to such machines and their adjunct infrastructure. See Perceptual control theory, §Open-loop and closed-loop feedback

Elements of the scientific method
There are different ways of outlining the basic method used for scientific inquiry. The scientific community and philosophers of science generally agree on the following classification of method components. These methodological elements and organization of procedures tend to be more characteristic of experimental sciences than social sciences. Nonetheless, the cycle of formulating hypotheses, testing and analyzing the results, and formulating new hypotheses, will resemble the cycle described below.

The scientific method is an iterative, cyclical process through which information is continually revised. It is generally recognized to develop advances in knowledge through the following elements, in varying combinations or contributions:
 Characterizations (observations, definitions, and measurements of the subject of inquiry)
 Hypotheses (theoretical, hypothetical explanations of observations and measurements of the subject)
 Predictions (inductive and deductive reasoning from the hypothesis or theory)
 Experiments (tests of all of the above)

Each element of the scientific method is subject to peer review for possible mistakes. These activities do not describe all that scientists do but apply mostly to experimental sciences (e.g., physics, chemistry, biology, and psychology). The elements above are often taught in the educational system as "the scientific method".

The scientific method is not a single recipe: it requires intelligence, imagination, and creativity. In this sense, it is not a mindless set of standards and procedures to follow, but is rather an ongoing cycle, constantly developing more useful, accurate, and comprehensive models and methods. For example, when Einstein developed the Special and General Theories of Relativity, he did not in any way refute or discount Newton's Principia. On the contrary, if the astronomically massive, the feather-light, and the extremely fast are removed from Einstein's theories – all phenomena Newton could not have observed – Newton's equations are what remain. Einstein's theories are expansions and refinements of Newton's theories and, thus, increase confidence in Newton's work.

An iterative, pragmatic scheme of the four points above is sometimes offered as a guideline for proceeding:

 Define a question
 Gather information and resources (observe)
 Form an explanatory hypothesis
 Test the hypothesis by performing an experiment and collecting data in a reproducible manner
 Analyze the data
 Interpret the data and draw conclusions that serve as a starting point for a new hypothesis
 Publish results
 Retest (frequently done by other scientists)

The iterative cycle inherent in this step-by-step method goes from point 3 to 6 back to 3 again.

While this schema outlines a typical hypothesis/testing method, many philosophers, historians, and sociologists of science, including Paul Feyerabend, claim that such descriptions of scientific method have little relation to the ways that science is actually practiced.

Characterizations
The scientific method depends upon increasingly sophisticated characterizations of the subjects of investigation. (The subjects can also be called unsolved problems or the unknowns.) For example, Benjamin Franklin conjectured, correctly, that St. Elmo's fire was electrical in nature, but it has taken a long series of experiments and theoretical changes to establish this. While seeking the pertinent properties of the subjects, careful thought may also entail some definitions and observations; the observations often demand careful measurements and/or counting.

The systematic, careful collection of measurements or counts of relevant quantities is often the critical difference between pseudo-sciences, such as alchemy, and science, such as chemistry or biology. Scientific measurements are usually tabulated, graphed, or mapped, and statistical manipulations, such as correlation and regression, performed on them. The measurements might be made in a controlled setting, such as a laboratory, or made on more or less inaccessible or unmanipulatable objects such as stars or human populations. The measurements often require specialized scientific instruments such as thermometers, spectroscopes, particle accelerators, or voltmeters, and the progress of a scientific field is usually intimately tied to their invention and improvement.

Uncertainty
Measurements in scientific work are also usually accompanied by estimates of their uncertainty. The uncertainty is often estimated by making repeated measurements of the desired quantity. Uncertainties may also be calculated by consideration of the uncertainties of the individual underlying quantities used. Counts of things, such as the number of people in a nation at a particular time, may also have an uncertainty due to data collection limitations. Or counts may represent a sample of desired quantities, with an uncertainty that depends upon the sampling method used and the number of samples taken.

Definition
Measurements demand the use of operational definitions of relevant quantities. That is, a scientific quantity is described or defined by how it is measured, as opposed to some more vague, inexact, or "idealized" definition. For example, electric current, measured in amperes, may be operationally defined in terms of the mass of silver deposited in a certain time on an electrode in an electrochemical device that is described in some detail. The operational definition of a thing often relies on comparisons with standards: the operational definition of "mass" ultimately relies on the use of an artifact, such as a particular kilogram of platinum-iridium kept in a laboratory in France.

The scientific definition of a term sometimes differs substantially from its natural language usage. For example, mass and weight overlap in meaning in common discourse, but have distinct meanings in mechanics. Scientific quantities are often characterized by their units of measure which can later be described in terms of conventional physical units when communicating the work.

New theories are sometimes developed after realizing certain terms have not previously been sufficiently clearly defined. For example, Albert Einstein's first paper on relativity begins by defining simultaneity and the means for determining length. These ideas were skipped over by Isaac Newton with, "I do not define time, space, place and motion, as being well known to all." Einstein's paper then demonstrates that they (viz., absolute time and length independent of motion) were approximations. Francis Crick cautions us that when characterizing a subject, however, it can be premature to define something when it remains ill-understood. In Crick's study of consciousness, he actually found it easier to study awareness in the visual system, rather than to study free will, for example. His cautionary example was the gene; the gene was much more poorly understood before Watson and Crick's pioneering discovery of the structure of DNA; it would have been counterproductive to spend much time on the definition of the gene, before them.

DNA-characterizations
 The history of the discovery of the structure of DNA is a classic example of the elements of the scientific method: in 1950 it was known that genetic inheritance had a mathematical description, starting with the studies of Gregor Mendel, and that DNA contained genetic information (Oswald Avery's transforming principle). But the mechanism of storing genetic information (i.e., genes) in DNA was unclear. Researchers in Bragg's laboratory at Cambridge University made X-ray diffraction pictures of various molecules, starting with crystals of salt, and proceeding to more complicated substances. Using clues painstakingly assembled over decades, beginning with its chemical composition, it was determined that it should be possible to characterize the physical structure of DNA, and the X-ray images would be the vehicle. ..2. DNA-hypotheses

Another example: precession of Mercury

The characterization element can require extended and extensive study, even centuries. It took thousands of years of measurements, from the Chaldean, Indian, Persian, Greek, Arabic, and European astronomers, to fully record the motion of planet Earth. Newton was able to include those measurements into the consequences of his laws of motion. But the perihelion of the planet Mercury's orbit exhibits a precession that cannot be fully explained by Newton's laws of motion (see diagram to the right), as Leverrier pointed out in 1859. The observed difference for Mercury's precession between Newtonian theory and observation was one of the things that occurred to Albert Einstein as a possible early test of his theory of General relativity. His relativistic calculations matched observation much more closely than did Newtonian theory. The difference is approximately 43 arc-seconds per century.

Hypothesis development

A hypothesis is a suggested explanation of a phenomenon, or alternately a reasoned proposal suggesting a possible correlation between or among a set of phenomena.

Normally hypotheses have the form of a mathematical model. Sometimes, but not always, they can also be formulated as existential statements, stating that some particular instance of the phenomenon being studied has some characteristic and causal explanations, which have the general form of universal statements, stating that every instance of the phenomenon has a particular characteristic.

Scientists are free to use whatever resources they have – their own creativity, ideas from other fields, inductive reasoning, Bayesian inference, and so on – to imagine possible explanations for a phenomenon under study. Albert Einstein once observed that "there is no logical bridge between phenomena and their theoretical principles." Charles Sanders Peirce, borrowing a page from Aristotle (Prior Analytics, 2.25) described the incipient stages of inquiry, instigated by the "irritation of doubt" to venture a plausible guess, as abductive reasoning. The history of science is filled with stories of scientists claiming a "flash of inspiration", or a hunch, which then motivated them to look for evidence to support or refute their idea. Michael Polanyi made such creativity the centerpiece of his discussion of methodology.

William Glen observes that

In general scientists tend to look for theories that are "elegant" or "beautiful". Scientists often use these terms to refer to a theory that is following the known facts but is nevertheless relatively simple and easy to handle. Occam's Razor serves as a rule of thumb for choosing the most desirable amongst a group of equally explanatory hypotheses.

To minimize the confirmation bias which results from entertaining a single hypothesis, strong inference emphasizes the need for entertaining multiple alternative hypotheses.

DNA-hypotheses
 Linus Pauling proposed that DNA might be a triple helix. This hypothesis was also considered by Francis Crick and James D. Watson but discarded. When Watson and Crick learned of Pauling's hypothesis, they understood from existing data that Pauling was wrong. and that Pauling would soon admit his difficulties with that structure. So, the race was on to figure out the correct structure (except that Pauling did not realize at the time that he was in a race) ..3. DNA-predictions

Predictions from the hypothesis

Any useful hypothesis will enable predictions, by reasoning including deductive reasoning. It might predict the outcome of an experiment in a laboratory setting or the observation of a phenomenon in nature. The prediction can also be statistical and deal only with probabilities.

It is essential that the outcome of testing such a prediction be currently unknown. Only in this case does a successful outcome increase the probability that the hypothesis is true. If the outcome is already known, it is called a consequence and should have already been considered while formulating the hypothesis.

If the predictions are not accessible by observation or experience, the hypothesis is not yet testable and so will remain to that extent unscientific in a strict sense. A new technology or theory might make the necessary experiments feasible. For example, while a hypothesis on the existence of other intelligent species may be convincing with scientifically based speculation, no known experiment can test this hypothesis. Therefore, science itself can have little to say about the possibility. In the future, a new technique may allow for an experimental test and the speculation would then become part of accepted science.

DNA-predictions
 James D. Watson, Francis Crick, and others hypothesized that DNA had a helical structure. This implied that DNA's X-ray diffraction pattern would be 'x shaped'. This prediction followed from the work of Cochran, Crick and Vand (and independently by Stokes). The Cochran-Crick-Vand-Stokes theorem provided a mathematical explanation for the empirical observation that diffraction from helical structures produces x shaped patterns.

In their first paper, Watson and Crick also noted that the double helix structure they proposed provided a simple mechanism for DNA replication, writing, "It has not escaped our notice that the specific pairing we have postulated immediately suggests a possible copying mechanism for the genetic material".  ..4. DNA-experiments

Another example: general relativity

Einstein's theory of general relativity makes several specific predictions about the observable structure of spacetime, such as that light bends in a gravitational field, and that the amount of bending depends in a precise way on the strength of that gravitational field. Arthur Eddington's observations made during a 1919 solar eclipse supported General Relativity rather than Newtonian gravitation.

Experiments

Once predictions are made, they can be sought by experiments. If the test results contradict the predictions, the hypotheses which entailed them are called into question and become less tenable. Sometimes the experiments are conducted incorrectly or are not very well designed when compared to a crucial experiment. If the experimental results confirm the predictions, then the hypotheses are considered more likely to be correct, but might still be wrong and continue to be subject to further testing. The experimental control is a technique for dealing with observational error. This technique uses the contrast between multiple samples, or observations, or populations, under differing conditions, to see what varies or what remains the same. We vary the conditions for the acts of measurement, to help isolate what has changed. Mill's canons can then help us figure out what the important factor is. Factor analysis is one technique for discovering the important factor in an effect.

Depending on the predictions, the experiments can have different shapes. It could be a classical experiment in a laboratory setting, a double-blind study or an archaeological excavation. Even taking a plane from New York to Paris is an experiment that tests the aerodynamical hypotheses used for constructing the plane.

Scientists assume an attitude of openness and accountability on the part of those experimenting. Detailed record-keeping is essential, to aid in recording and reporting on the experimental results, and supports the effectiveness and integrity of the procedure. They will also assist in reproducing the experimental results, likely by others. Traces of this approach can be seen in the work of Hipparchus (190–120 BCE), when determining a value for the precession of the Earth, while controlled experiments can be seen in the works of al-Battani (853–929 CE) and Alhazen (965–1039 CE).

DNA-experiments
 Watson and Crick showed an initial (and incorrect) proposal for the structure of DNA to a team from King's College London – Rosalind Franklin, Maurice Wilkins, and Raymond Gosling. Franklin immediately spotted the flaws which concerned the water content. Later Watson saw Franklin's detailed X-ray diffraction images which showed an X-shape and was able to confirm the structure was helical. This rekindled Watson and Crick's model building and led to the correct structure. ..1. DNA-characterizations

Evaluation and improvement
The scientific method is iterative. At any stage, it is possible to refine its accuracy and precision, so that some consideration will lead the scientist to repeat an earlier part of the process. Failure to develop an interesting hypothesis may lead a scientist to re-define the subject under consideration. Failure of a hypothesis to produce interesting and testable predictions may lead to reconsideration of the hypothesis or of the definition of the subject. Failure of an experiment to produce interesting results may lead a scientist to reconsider the experimental method, the hypothesis, or the definition of the subject.

By 1027, Alhazen, based on his measurements of the refraction of light, was able to deduce that outer space was less dense than air, that is: "the body of the heavens is rarer than the body of air". In 1079 Ibn Mu'adh's Treatise On Twilight was able to infer that Earth's atmosphere was 50 miles thick, based on atmospheric refraction of the sun's rays.

Other scientists may start their own research and enter the process at any stage. They might adopt the characterization and formulate their own hypothesis, or they might adopt the hypothesis and deduce their own predictions. Often the experiment is not done by the person who made the prediction, and the characterization is based on experiments done by someone else. Published results of experiments can also serve as a hypothesis predicting their own reproducibility.

DNA-iterations
 After considerable fruitless experimentation, being discouraged by their superior from continuing, and numerous false starts, Watson and Crick were able to infer the essential structure of DNA by concrete modeling of the physical shapes of the nucleotides which comprise it. They were guided by the bond lengths which had been deduced by Linus Pauling and by Rosalind Franklin's X-ray diffraction images. ..DNA Example

Confirmation
Science is a social enterprise, and scientific work tends to be accepted by the scientific community when it has been confirmed. Crucially, experimental and theoretical results must be reproduced by others within the scientific community. Researchers have given their lives for this vision; Georg Wilhelm Richmann was killed by ball lightning (1753) when attempting to replicate the 1752 kite-flying experiment of Benjamin Franklin.

To protect against bad science and fraudulent data, government research-granting agencies such as the National Science Foundation, and science journals, including Nature and Science, have a policy that researchers must archive their data and methods so that other researchers can test the data and methods and build on the research that has gone before. Scientific data archiving can be done at several national archives in the U.S. or the World Data Center.

Scientific inquiry
Scientific inquiry generally aims to obtain knowledge in the form of testable explanations that scientists can use to predict the results of future experiments. This allows scientists to gain a better understanding of the topic under study, and later to use that understanding to intervene in its causal mechanisms (such as to cure disease). The better an explanation is at making predictions, the more useful it frequently can be, and the more likely it will continue to explain a body of evidence better than its alternatives. The most successful explanations – those which explain and make accurate predictions in a wide range of circumstances – are often called scientific theories.

Most experimental results do not produce large changes in human understanding; improvements in theoretical scientific understanding typically result from a gradual process of development over time, sometimes across different domains of science. Scientific models vary in the extent to which they have been experimentally tested and for how long, and in their acceptance in the scientific community. In general, explanations become accepted over time as evidence accumulates on a given topic, and the explanation in question proves more powerful than its alternatives at explaining the evidence. Often subsequent researchers re-formulate the explanations over time, or combined explanations to produce new explanations.

Tow sees the scientific method in terms of an evolutionary algorithm applied to science and technology. See Ceteris paribus, and Mutatis mutandis

Properties of scientific inquiry

Scientific knowledge is closely tied to empirical findings and can remain subject to falsification if new experimental observations are incompatible with what is found. That is, no theory can ever be considered final since new problematic evidence might be discovered. If such evidence is found, a new theory may be proposed, or (more commonly) it is found that modifications to the previous theory are sufficient to explain the new evidence. The strength of a theory relates to how long it has persisted without major alteration to its core principles (see invariant explanations).

Theories can also become subsumed by other theories. For example, Newton's laws explained thousands of years of scientific observations of the planets almost perfectly. However, these laws were then determined to be special cases of a more general theory (relativity), which explained both the (previously unexplained) exceptions to Newton's laws and predicted and explained other observations such as the deflection of light by gravity. Thus, in certain cases independent, unconnected, scientific observations can be connected, unified by principles of increasing explanatory power.

Since new theories might be more comprehensive than what preceded them, and thus be able to explain more than previous ones, successor theories might be able to meet a higher standard by explaining a larger body of observations than their predecessors. For example, the theory of evolution explains the diversity of life on Earth, how species adapt to their environments, and many other patterns observed in the natural world; its most recent major modification was unification with genetics to form the modern evolutionary synthesis. In subsequent modifications, it has also subsumed aspects of many other fields such as biochemistry and molecular biology.

Beliefs and biases

Scientific methodology often directs that hypotheses be tested in controlled conditions wherever possible. This is frequently possible in certain areas, such as in the biological sciences, and more difficult in other areas, such as in astronomy.

The practice of experimental control and reproducibility can have the effect of diminishing the potentially harmful effects of circumstance, and to a degree, personal bias. For example, pre-existing beliefs can alter the interpretation of results, as in confirmation bias; this is a heuristic that leads a person with a particular belief to see things as reinforcing their belief, even if another observer might disagree (in other words, people tend to observe what they expect to observe).

A historical example is the belief that the legs of a galloping horse are splayed at the point when none of the horse's legs touch the ground, to the point of this image being included in paintings by its supporters. However, the first stop-action pictures of a horse's gallop by Eadweard Muybridge showed this to be false, and that the legs are instead gathered together.

Another important human bias that plays a role is a preference for new, surprising statements (see Appeal to novelty), which can result in a search for evidence that the new is true. Poorly attested beliefs can be believed and acted upon via a less rigorous heuristic.

Goldhaber and Nieto published in 2010 the observation that if theoretical structures with "many closely neighboring subjects are described by connecting theoretical concepts, then the theoretical structure acquires a robustness which makes it increasingly hardthough certainly never impossibleto overturn". When a narrative is constructed its elements become easier to believe.

 notes "Words and ideas are originally phonetic and mental equivalences of the experiences coinciding with them. ... Such proto-ideas are at first always too broad and insufficiently specialized. ... Once a structurally complete and closed system of opinions consisting of many details and relations has been formed, it offers enduring resistance to anything that contradicts it". Sometimes, these relations have their elements assumed a priori, or contain some other logical or methodological flaw in the process that ultimately produced them. Donald M. MacKay has analyzed these elements in terms of limits to the accuracy of measurement and has related them to instrumental elements in a category of measurement.

Models of scientific inquiry

Classical model
The classical model of scientific inquiry derives from Aristotle, who distinguished the forms of approximate and exact reasoning, set out the threefold scheme of abductive, deductive, and inductive inference, and also treated the compound forms such as reasoning by analogy.

Hypothetico-deductive model
The hypothetico-deductive model or method is a proposed description of the scientific method. Here, predictions from the hypothesis are central: if you assume the hypothesis to be true, what consequences follow?

If a subsequent empirical investigation does not demonstrate that these consequences or predictions correspond to the observable world, the hypothesis can be concluded to be false.

Pragmatic model

In 1877, Charles Sanders Peirce (1839–1914) characterized inquiry in general not as the pursuit of truth per se but as the struggle to move from irritating, inhibitory doubts born of surprises, disagreements, and the like, and to reach a secure belief, the belief being that on which one is prepared to act. He framed scientific inquiry as part of a broader spectrum and as spurred, like inquiry generally, by actual doubt, not mere verbal or hyperbolic doubt, which he held to be fruitless. He outlined four methods of settling opinion, ordered from least to most successful:
 The method of tenacity (policy of sticking to initial belief) – which brings comforts and decisiveness but leads to trying to ignore contrary information and others' views as if truth were intrinsically private, not public. It goes against the social impulse and easily falters since one may well notice when another's opinion is as good as one's own initial opinion. Its successes can shine but tend to be transitory.
 The method of authority – which overcomes disagreements but sometimes brutally. Its successes can be majestic and long-lived, but it cannot operate thoroughly enough to suppress doubts indefinitely, especially when people learn of other societies' present and past.
 The method of the a priori – which promotes conformity less brutally but fosters opinions as something like tastes, arising in conversation and comparisons of perspectives in terms of "what is agreeable to reason." Thereby it depends on fashion in paradigms and goes in circles over time. It is more intellectual and respectable but, like the first two methods, sustains accidental and capricious beliefs, destining some minds to doubt it.
 The scientific method – the method wherein inquiry regards itself as fallible and purposely tests itself and criticizes, corrects, and improves itself.

Peirce held that slow, stumbling ratiocination can be dangerously inferior to instinct and traditional sentiment in practical matters, and that the scientific method is best suited to theoretical research, which in turn should not be trammeled by the other methods and practical ends; reason's "first rule" is that, in order to learn, one must desire to learn and, as a corollary, must not block the way of inquiry. The scientific method excels the others by being deliberately designed to arrive – eventually – at the most secure beliefs, upon which the most successful practices can be based. Starting from the idea that people seek not truth per se but instead to subdue irritating, inhibitory doubt, Peirce showed how, through the struggle, some can come to submit to the truth for the sake of belief's integrity, seek as truth the guidance of potential practice correctly to its given goal, and wed themselves to the scientific method.

For Peirce, rational inquiry implies presuppositions about truth and the real; to reason is to presuppose (and at least to hope), as a principle of the reasoner's self-regulation, that the real is discoverable and independent of our vagaries of opinion. In that vein, he defined truth as the correspondence of a sign (in particular, a proposition) to its object and, pragmatically, not as the actual consensus of some definite, finite community (such that to inquire would be to poll the experts), but instead as that final opinion which all investigators would reach sooner or later but still inevitably, if they were to push investigation far enough, even when they start from different points. In tandem he defined the real as a true sign's object (be that object a possibility or quality, or an actuality or brute fact, or a necessity or norm or law), which is what it is independently of any finite community's opinion and, pragmatically, depends only on the final opinion destined in a sufficient investigation. That is a destination as far, or near, as the truth itself to you or me or the given finite community. Thus, his theory of inquiry boils down to "Do the science." Those conceptions of truth and the real involve the idea of a community both without definite limits (and thus potentially self-correcting as far as needed) and capable of definite increase of knowledge. As inference, "logic is rooted in the social principle" since it depends on a standpoint that is, in a sense, unlimited.

Paying special attention to the generation of explanations, Peirce outlined the scientific method as coordination of three kinds of inference in a purposeful cycle aimed at settling doubts, as follows (in §III–IV in "A Neglected Argument" except as otherwise noted):

Abduction (or retroduction). Guessing, inference to explanatory hypotheses for selection of those best worth trying. From abduction, Peirce distinguishes induction as inferring, based on tests, the proportion of truth in the hypothesis. Every inquiry, whether into ideas, brute facts, or norms and laws, arises from surprising observations in one or more of those realms (and for example at any stage of an inquiry already underway). All explanatory content of theories comes from abduction, which guesses a new or outside idea to account in a simple, economical way for a surprising or complicative phenomenon. Oftenest, even a well-prepared mind guesses wrong. But the modicum of success of our guesses far exceeds that of sheer luck and seems born of attunement to nature by instincts developed or inherent, especially insofar as best guesses are optimally plausible and simple in the sense, said Peirce, of the "facile and natural", as by Galileo's natural light of reason and as distinct from "logical simplicity". Abduction is the most fertile but least secure mode of inference. Its general rationale is inductive: it succeeds often enough and, without it, there is no hope of sufficiently expediting inquiry (often multi-generational) toward new truths. Coordinative method leads from abducing a plausible hypothesis to judging it for its testability and for how its trial would economize inquiry itself. Peirce calls his pragmatism "the logic of abduction". His pragmatic maxim is: "Consider what effects that might conceivably have practical bearings you conceive the objects of your conception to have. Then, your conception of those effects is the whole of your conception of the object". His pragmatism is a method of reducing conceptual confusions fruitfully by equating the meaning of any conception with the conceivable practical implications of its object's conceived effects – a method of experimentational mental reflection hospitable to forming hypotheses and conducive to testing them. It favors efficiency. The hypothesis, being insecure, needs to have practical implications leading at least to mental tests and, in science, lending themselves to scientific tests. A simple but unlikely guess, if uncostly to test for falsity, may belong first in line for testing. A guess is intrinsically worth testing if it has instinctive plausibility or reasoned objective probability, while subjective likelihood, though reasoned, can be misleadingly seductive. Guesses can be chosen for trial strategically, for their caution (for which Peirce gave as an example the game of Twenty Questions), breadth, and incomplexity. One can hope to discover only that which time would reveal through a learner's sufficient experience anyway, so the point is to expedite it; the economy of research is what demands the leap, so to speak, of abduction and governs its art.

Deduction. Two stages:
Explication. Unclearly premised, but deductive, analysis of the hypothesis in order to render its parts as clear as possible.
Demonstration: Deductive argumentation, Euclidean in procedure. Explicit deduction of hypothesis's consequences as predictions, for induction to test, about evidence to be found. Corollarial or, if needed, theorematic.

Induction. The long-run validity of the rule of induction is deducible from the principle (presuppositional to reasoning, in general,) that the real is only the object of the final opinion to which adequate investigation would lead; anything to which no such process would ever lead would not be real. Induction involving ongoing tests or observations follows a method which, sufficiently persisted in, will diminish its error below any predesignate degree. Three stages:
Classification. Unclearly premised, but inductive, classing of objects of experience under general ideas.
Probation: direct inductive argumentation. Crude (the enumeration of instances) or gradual (new estimate of the proportion of truth in the hypothesis after each test). Gradual induction is qualitative or quantitative; if qualitative, then dependent on weightings of qualities or characters; if quantitative, then dependent on measurements, or on statistics, or on countings.
Sentential Induction. "... which, by inductive reasonings, appraises the different probations singly, then their combinations, then makes self-appraisal of these very appraisals themselves, and passes final judgment on the whole result".

Invariant explanation

Communication and community

Frequently the scientific method is employed not only by a single person but also by several people cooperating directly or indirectly. Such cooperation can be regarded as an important element of a scientific community. Various standards of scientific methodology are used within such an environment.

Peer review evaluation
Scientific journals use a process of peer review, in which scientists' manuscripts are submitted by editors of scientific journals to (usually one to three, and usually anonymous) fellow scientists familiar with the field for evaluation. In certain journals, the journal itself selects the referees; while in others (especially journals that are extremely specialized), the manuscript author might recommend referees. The referees may or may not recommend publication, or they might recommend publication with suggested modifications, or sometimes, publication in another journal. This standard is practiced to various degrees by different journals and can have the effect of keeping the literature free of obvious errors and generally improve the quality of the material, especially in the journals that use the standard most rigorously. The peer-review process can have limitations when considering research outside the conventional scientific paradigm: problems of "groupthink" can interfere with open and fair deliberation of some new research.

Documentation and replication

Sometimes experimenters may make systematic errors during their experiments, veer from standard methods and practices (Pathological science) for various reasons, or, in rare cases, deliberately report false results. Occasionally because of this then, other scientists might attempt to repeat the experiments to duplicate the results.

Archiving
Researchers sometimes practice scientific data archiving, such as in compliance with the policies of government funding agencies and scientific journals. In these cases, detailed records of their experimental procedures, raw data, statistical analyses, and source code can be preserved to provide evidence of the methodology and practice of the procedure and assist in any potential future attempts to reproduce the result. These procedural records may also assist in the conception of new experiments to test the hypothesis, and may prove useful to engineers who might examine the potential practical applications of a discovery.

Data sharing
When additional information is needed before a study can be reproduced, the author of the study might be asked to provide it. They might provide it, or if the author refuses to share data, appeals can be made to the journal editors who published the study or to the institution which funded the research.

Limitations
Since a scientist can't record everything that took place in an experiment, facts selected for their apparent relevance are reported. This may lead, unavoidably, to problems later if some supposedly irrelevant feature is questioned. For example, Heinrich Hertz did not report the size of the room used to test Maxwell's equations, which later turned out to account for a small deviation in the results. The problem is that parts of the theory itself need to be assumed to select and report the experimental conditions. The observations are hence sometimes described as being 'theory-laden'.

Science of complex systems
Science applied to complex systems can involve elements such as transdisciplinarity, systems theory, control theory, and scientific modelling. The Santa Fe Institute studies such systems; Murray Gell-Mann interconnects these topics with message passing.

Some biological systems, such those involved in proprioception, have been fruitfully modeled by  engineering techniques.

In general, the scientific method may be difficult to apply stringently to diverse, interconnected systems and large data sets. In particular, practices used within Big data, such as predictive analytics, may be considered to be at odds with the scientific method, as some of the data may have been stripped of the parameters which might be material in alternative hypotheses for an explanation; thus the stripped data would only serve to support the null hypothesis in the predictive analytics application.  notes "a scientific discovery remains incomplete without considerations of the social practices that condition it".

Philosophy and sociology of science

Analytical philosophy
Philosophy of science looks at the underpinning logic of the scientific method, at what separates science from non-science, and the ethic that is implicit in science. There are basic assumptions, derived from philosophy by at least one prominent scientist, that form the base of the scientific method – namely, that reality is objective and consistent, that humans have the capacity to perceive reality accurately, and that rational explanations exist for elements of the real world. These assumptions from methodological naturalism form a basis on which science may be grounded. Logical positivist, empiricist, falsificationist, and other theories have criticized these assumptions and given alternative accounts of the logic of science, but each has also itself been criticized.

Thomas Kuhn examined the history of science in his The Structure of Scientific Revolutions, and found that the actual method used by scientists differed dramatically from the then-espoused method. His observations of science practice are essentially sociological and do not speak to how science is or can be practiced in other times and other cultures.

Norwood Russell Hanson, Imre Lakatos and Thomas Kuhn have done extensive work on the "theory-laden" character of observation. Hanson (1958) first coined the term for the idea that all observation is dependent on the conceptual framework of the observer, using the concept of gestalt to show how preconceptions can affect both observation and description. He opens Chapter 1 with a discussion of the Golgi bodies and their initial rejection as an artefact of staining technique, and a discussion of Brahe and Kepler observing the dawn and seeing a "different" sunrise despite the same physiological phenomenon. Kuhn and Feyerabend acknowledge the pioneering significance of Hanson's work.

Kuhn said the scientist generally has a theory in mind before designing and undertaking experiments to make empirical observations, and that the "route from theory to measurement can almost never be traveled backward". For Kuhn, this implies that how theory is tested is dictated by the nature of the theory itself, which led Kuhn to argue that "once it has been adopted by a profession ... no theory is recognized to be testable by any quantitative tests that it has not already passed" (revealing Kuhn's rationalist thinking style).

Post-modernism and science wars
Paul Feyerabend similarly examined the history of science, and was led to deny that science is genuinely a methodological process. In his book Against Method he argues that scientific progress is not the result of applying any particular method. In essence, he says that for any specific method or norm of science, one can find a historic episode where violating it has contributed to the progress of science. Thus, if believers in the scientific method wish to express a single universally valid rule, Feyerabend jokingly suggests, it should be 'anything goes'. However, this is uneconomic. Criticisms such as Feyerabend's led to the strong programme, a radical approach to the sociology of science.

The postmodernist critiques of science have themselves been the subject of intense controversy. This ongoing debate, known as the science wars, is the result of conflicting values and assumptions between the postmodernist and realist camps. Whereas postmodernists assert that scientific knowledge is simply another discourse (note that this term has special meaning in this context) and not representative of any form of fundamental truth, realists in the scientific community maintain that scientific knowledge does reveal real and fundamental truths about reality. Many books have been written by scientists which take on this problem and challenge the assertions of the postmodernists while defending science as a legitimate method of deriving truth.

Anthropology and sociology
In anthropology and sociology, following the field research in an academic scientific laboratory by Latour and Woolgar, Karin Knorr Cetina has conducted a comparative study of two scientific fields (namely high energy physics and molecular biology) to conclude that the epistemic practices and reasonings within both scientific communities are different enough to introduce the concept of "epistemic cultures", in contradiction with the idea that a so-called "scientific method" is unique and a unifying concept. Comparing 'epistemic cultures' with Fleck 1935, Thought collectives, (denkkollektiven): Entstehung und Entwicklung einer wissenschaftlichen Tatsache: Einfǖhrung in die Lehre vom Denkstil und Denkkollektiv
 recognizes that facts have lifetimes, flourishing only after incubation periods. His selected question for investigation (1934) was "HOW, THEN, DID THIS EMPIRICAL FACT ORIGINATE AND IN WHAT DOES IT CONSIST?". But by Fleck 1979, p.27, the thought collectives within the respective fields will have to settle on common specialized terminology, publish their results and further intercommunicate with their colleagues using the common terminology, in order to progress. 
See: Cognitive revolution, Psychology and neuroscience

Relationship with mathematics
Science is the process of gathering, comparing, and evaluating proposed models against observables. A model can be a simulation, mathematical or chemical formula, or set of proposed steps. Science is like mathematics in that researchers in both disciplines try to distinguish what is known from what is unknown at each stage of discovery. Models, in both science and mathematics, need to be internally consistent and also ought to be falsifiable (capable of disproof). In mathematics, a statement need not yet be proved; at such a stage, that statement would be called a conjecture. But when a statement has attained mathematical proof, that statement gains a kind of immortality which is highly prized by mathematicians, and for which some mathematicians devote their lives.

Mathematical work and scientific work can inspire each other. For example, the technical concept of time arose in science, and timelessness was a hallmark of a mathematical topic. But today, the Poincaré conjecture has been proved using time as a mathematical concept in which objects can flow (see Ricci flow).

Nevertheless, the connection between mathematics and reality (and so science to the extent it describes reality) remains obscure. Eugene Wigner's paper, The Unreasonable Effectiveness of Mathematics in the Natural Sciences, is a very well-known account of the issue from a Nobel Prize-winning physicist. In fact, some observers (including some well-known mathematicians such as Gregory Chaitin, and others such as Lakoff and Núñez) have suggested that mathematics is the result of practitioner bias and human limitation (including cultural ones), somewhat like the post-modernist view of science.

George Pólya's work on problem solving, the construction of mathematical proofs, and heuristic show that the mathematical method and the scientific method differ in detail, while nevertheless resembling each other in using iterative or recursive steps.

In Pólya's view, understanding involves restating unfamiliar definitions in your own words, resorting to geometrical figures, and questioning what we know and do not know already; analysis, which Pólya takes from Pappus, involves free and heuristic construction of plausible arguments, working backward from the goal, and devising a plan for constructing the proof; synthesis is the strict Euclidean exposition of step-by-step details of the proof; review involves reconsidering and re-examining the result and the path taken to it.

Building on Pólya's work, Imre Lakatos argued that mathematicians actually use contradiction, criticism, and revision as principles for improving their work. In like manner to science, where truth is sought, but certainty is not found, in Proofs and Refutations, what Lakatos tried to establish was that no theorem of informal mathematics is final or perfect. This means that we should not think that a theorem is ultimately true, only that no counterexample has yet been found. Once a counterexample, i.e. an entity contradicting/not explained by the theorem is found, we adjust the theorem, possibly extending the domain of its validity. This is a continuous way our knowledge accumulates, through the logic and process of proofs and refutations. (However, if axioms are given for a branch of mathematics, this creates a logical system —Wittgenstein 1921 Tractatus Logico-Philosophicus 5.13; Lakatos claimed that proofs from such a system were tautological, i.e. internally logically true, by rewriting forms, as shown by Poincaré, who demonstrated the technique of transforming tautologically true forms (viz. the Euler characteristic) into or out of forms from homology, or more abstractly, from homological algebra.)

Lakatos proposed an account of mathematical knowledge based on Polya's idea of heuristics. In Proofs and Refutations, Lakatos gave several basic rules for finding proofs and counterexamples to conjectures. He thought that mathematical 'thought experiments' are a valid way to discover mathematical conjectures and proofs.

Gauss, when asked how he came about his theorems, once replied "durch planmässiges Tattonieren" (through systematic palpable experimentation).

Relationship with statistics 
When the scientific method employs statistics as a key part of its arsenal, there are mathematical and practical issues that can have a deleterious effect on the reliability of the output of scientific methods. This is described in a popular 2005 scientific paper "Why Most Published Research Findings Are False" by John Ioannidis, which is considered foundational to the field of metascience. Much research in metascience seeks to identify poor use of statistics and improve its use. See Preregistration (science)#Rationale

The particular points raised are statistical ("The smaller the studies conducted in a scientific field, the less likely the research findings are to be true" and "The greater the flexibility in designs, definitions, outcomes, and analytical modes in a scientific field, the less likely the research findings are to be true.") and economical ("The greater the financial and other interests and prejudices in a scientific field, the less likely the research findings are to be true" and "The hotter a scientific field (with more scientific teams involved), the less likely the research findings are to be true.") Hence: "Most research findings are false for most research designs and for most fields" and "As shown, the majority of modern biomedical research is operating in areas with very low pre- and poststudy probability for true findings." However: "Nevertheless, most new discoveries will continue to stem from hypothesis-generating research with low or very low pre-study odds," which means that *new* discoveries will come from research that, when that research started, had low or very low odds (a low or very low chance) of succeeding. Hence, if the scientific method is used to expand the frontiers of knowledge, research into areas that are outside the mainstream will yield the newest discoveries. See: Expected value of sample information, False positives and false negatives, Test statistic, and Type I and type II errors

Role of chance in discovery

Somewhere between 33% and 50% of all scientific discoveries are estimated to have been stumbled upon, rather than sought out. This may explain why scientists so often express that they were lucky. Louis Pasteur is credited with the famous saying that "Luck favours the prepared mind", but some psychologists have begun to study what it means to be 'prepared for luck' in the scientific context. Research is showing that scientists are taught various heuristics that tend to harness chance and the unexpected. This is what Nassim Nicholas Taleb calls "Anti-fragility"; while some systems of investigation are fragile in the face of human error, human bias, and randomness, the scientific method is more than resistant or tough – it actually benefits from such randomness in many ways (it is anti-fragile). Taleb believes that the more anti-fragile the system, the more it will flourish in the real world.

Psychologist Kevin Dunbar says the process of discovery often starts with researchers finding bugs in their experiments. These unexpected results lead researchers to try to fix what they think is an error in their method. Eventually, the researcher decides the error is too persistent and systematic to be a coincidence. The highly controlled, cautious, and curious aspects of the scientific method are thus what make it well suited for identifying such persistent systematic errors. At this point, the researcher will begin to think of theoretical explanations for the error, often seeking the help of colleagues across different domains of expertise.

See also

 Armchair theorizing
 Contingency
 Empirical limits in science
 Evidence-based practices
 Fuzzy logic
 Information theory
 Logic
 Historical method
 Philosophical methodology
 Scholarly method
 Methodology
 Metascience
 Operationalization
 Quantitative research
 Rhetoric of science
 Royal Commission on Animal Magnetism
 Scientific law
 Social research
 Strong inference
 Testability
 Unsupervised learning
 Verificationism

Problems and issues

 Descriptive science
 Design science
 Holism in science
 Junk science
 List of cognitive biases
 Normative science
 Philosophical skepticism
 Poverty of the stimulus
 Problem of induction
 Pseudoscience
 Reference class problem
 Replication crisis
 Skeptical hypotheses
 Underdetermination

History, philosophy, sociology

 Baconian method
 Epistemology
 Epistemic truth
 Mertonian norms
 Normal science
 Post-normal science
 Science studies

 Timeline of the history of scientific method

Notes

Notes: Problem-solving via scientific method

References

Sources

 , also published by Dover, 1964. From the Waynflete Lectures, 1948. On the web. N.B.: the web version does not have the 3 addenda by Born, 1950, 1964, in which he notes that all knowledge is subjective. Born then proposes a solution in Appendix 3 (1964)
 .
 
 .
 
 Reviewed in: 
 
  Public domain in the US. 236 pages
 .
 
 .
 . (written in German, 1935, Entstehung und Entwickelung einer wissenschaftlichen Tatsache: Einführung in die Lehre vom Denkstil und Denkkollectiv) English translation by Thaddeus J. Trenn and Fred Bradley, 1979 Edited by Thaddeus J. Trenn and Robert K. Merton. Foreword by Robert K. Merton
 .
 
 .
 .
 
 
 . 1877, 1879. Reprinted with a foreword by Ernst Nagel, New York, 1958.
 
  JSTOR
 
  2nd edition 2007.
 
 . Memoir of a researcher in the Avery–MacLeod–McCarty experiment.
 .
 .
 
 , Third edition. From I. Bernard Cohen and Anne Whitman's 1999 translation.
 . Translated to English by Karen Jelved, Andrew D. Jackson, and Ole Knudsen, (translators 1997).
 Peirce, C.S. – see Charles Sanders Peirce bibliography.
 .
  (}
 .
 .
 .
 .
  Critical edition.
 
 
 
 
 
 .

Further reading

 Bauer, Henry H., Scientific Literacy and the Myth of the Scientific Method, University of Illinois Press, Champaign, IL, 1992
 Beveridge, William I.B., The Art of Scientific Investigation, Heinemann, Melbourne, Australia, 1950.
 Bernstein, Richard J., Beyond Objectivism and Relativism: Science, Hermeneutics, and Praxis, University of Pennsylvania Press, Philadelphia, PA, 1983.
 Brody, Baruch A. and Capaldi, Nicholas, Science: Men, Methods, Goals: A Reader: Methods of Physical Science, W.A. Benjamin, 1968
 Brody, Baruch A. and Grandy, Richard E., Readings in the Philosophy of Science, 2nd edition, Prentice-Hall, Englewood Cliffs, NJ, 1989.
 Burks, Arthur W., Chance, Cause, Reason: An Inquiry into the Nature of Scientific Evidence, University of Chicago Press, Chicago, IL, 1977.
 Chalmers, Alan, What Is This Thing Called Science?. Queensland University Press and Open University Press, 1976. 
 .
 
 Earman, John (ed.), Inference, Explanation, and Other Frustrations: Essays in the Philosophy of Science, University of California Press, Berkeley & Los Angeles, CA, 1992.
 Fraassen, Bas C. van, The Scientific Image, Oxford University Press, Oxford, 1980.
 .
 Gadamer, Hans-Georg, Reason in the Age of Science, Frederick G. Lawrence (trans.), MIT Press, Cambridge, MA, 1981.
 Giere, Ronald N. (ed.), Cognitive Models of Science, vol. 15 in 'Minnesota Studies in the Philosophy of Science', University of Minnesota Press, Minneapolis, MN, 1992.
 Hacking, Ian, Representing and Intervening, Introductory Topics in the Philosophy of Natural Science, Cambridge University Press, Cambridge, 1983.
 Heisenberg, Werner, Physics and Beyond, Encounters and Conversations, A.J. Pomerans (trans.), Harper and Row, New York, 1971, pp. 63–64.
 Holton, Gerald, Thematic Origins of Scientific Thought: Kepler to Einstein, 1st edition 1973, revised edition, Harvard University Press, Cambridge, MA, 1988.
 Karin Knorr Cetina, 
 Kuhn, Thomas S., The Essential Tension, Selected Studies in Scientific Tradition and Change, University of Chicago Press, Chicago, IL, 1977.
 Latour, Bruno, Science in Action, How to Follow Scientists and Engineers through Society, Harvard University Press, Cambridge, MA, 1987.
 Losee, John, A Historical Introduction to the Philosophy of Science, Oxford University Press, Oxford, 1972. 2nd edition, 1980.
 Maxwell, Nicholas, The Comprehensibility of the Universe: A New Conception of Science, Oxford University Press, Oxford, 1998. Paperback 2003.
 Maxwell, Nicholas, Understanding Scientific Progress, Paragon House, St. Paul, Minnesota, 2017.
 
 Misak, Cheryl J., Truth and the End of Inquiry, A Peircean Account of Truth, Oxford University Press, Oxford, 1991.
 Piattelli-Palmarini, Massimo (ed.), Language and Learning, The Debate between Jean Piaget and Noam Chomsky, Harvard University Press, Cambridge, MA, 1980.
 Popper, Karl R., Unended Quest, An Intellectual Autobiography, Open Court, La Salle, IL, 1982.
 Putnam, Hilary, Renewing Philosophy, Harvard University Press, Cambridge, MA, 1992.
 Rorty, Richard, Philosophy and the Mirror of Nature, Princeton University Press, Princeton, NJ, 1979.
 Salmon, Wesley C., Four Decades of Scientific Explanation, University of Minnesota Press, Minneapolis, MN, 1990.
 Shimony, Abner, Search for a Naturalistic World View: Vol. 1, Scientific Method and Epistemology, Vol. 2, Natural Science and Metaphysics, Cambridge University Press, Cambridge, 1993.
 Thagard, Paul, Conceptual Revolutions, Princeton University Press, Princeton, NJ, 1992.
 Ziman, John (2000). Real Science: what it is, and what it means. Cambridge: Cambridge University Press.

External links

 
 
 
 
 An Introduction to Science: Scientific Thinking and a scientific method by Steven D. Schafersman.
 Introduction to the scientific method at the University of Rochester
 The scientific method from a philosophical perspective
 Theory-ladenness by Paul Newall at The Galilean Library
 Lecture on Scientific Method by Greg Anderson
 Using the scientific method for designing science fair projects
 Scientific Methods an online book by Richard D. Jarrard
 Richard Feynman on the Key to Science (one minute, three seconds), from the Cornell Lectures.
 Lectures on the Scientific Method by Nick Josh Karean, Kevin Padian, Michael Shermer and Richard Dawkins
 "How Do We Know What Is True?" (animated video; 2:52)

 
Scientific revolution
Philosophy of science
Empiricism